The following highways are numbered 421:

Canada
Manitoba Provincial Road 421
Newfoundland and Labrador Route 421

Japan
 Japan National Route 421

United States
  U.S. Route 421
  Florida State Road 421
  County Road 421 (Volusia County, Florida)
  Georgia State Route 421 (unsigned designation for Interstate 516)
  New Mexico State Road 421
  New York State Route 421
  Ohio State Route 421
  Puerto Rico Highway 421
  South Carolina Highway 421
  Tennessee State Route 421
  Texas State Highway Spur 421